The 1963 Uber Cup was the third edition of the Uber Cup, the women's badminton competition. The tournament took place in the 1962-63 badminton season, 11 countries competed. 

Defending champions the United States hosted the final and claimed victory over England — their third consecutive victory, largely on the strength of Judy Devlin once again winning all three of her matches.

Teams
As the defending champion, United States automatically advanced to the Challenge round.

Asia
 Indonesia
 India

Australasia
 New Zealand
 Australia

Europe
 England
 Ireland

Americas
 Canada
 United States

Knockout stages

Qualifying round

First round

Final round

Challenge round (Grand Final)

References

www.worldbadminton.net The Ladies' World Team Badminton Championship for the Uber Cup. Accessed 23 August 2006
 tangkis.tripod.com
 Mike's Badminton Populorum

Uber Cup
Thomas & Uber Cup
Badminton tournaments in the United States